Ghulam Dastagir Shaida ( Dari استاد غلام دستگیر شیدا ) Ustad Ghulam Dastagir (1916–1970) was an Afghan singer and musician. Ustad Shaida was born in the Kharabat neighborhood of Kabul, home of Kabul musicians who sung in classical Indian tradition. Ustad Shaida is considered as one of the great Ustads of Afghan classical music along with Ustad Sarahang and Ustad Rahim Bakhsh. His unique voice and style of singing resulted in fellow Kharabat musicians bestowing upon him the title of Shaida, which in Sufi tradition means one who has sacrificed himself for divine love.

His father Haji Afzal was a musician as well and played the Rubab, he also traveled quite often to India for business. During one of these trips he enrolled young Shaida to take lessons from Ustad Ghulam Hossein. Shaida traveled back to India in 1948 and begun taking lessons from Ustad Abdul Wahab Khan.

After Shaida's return from India and his popularity amongst musicians and public, he was awarded the title of "Ustad" (maestro) from Ministry of culture.

Ustad Shaida died of his injuries after a car accident in the outskirts of Kabul, 22 April 1970. His buried in Kabul.

Afghan musicians
Afghan Tajik people
1916 births
1970 deaths